Quiterio Ermes Olmedo (born 21 December 1907, date of death unknown) was a Paraguayan football defender who played for Paraguay in the 1930 FIFA World Cup. He also played for Club Nacional.

References

External links

Paraguayan footballers
Paraguay international footballers
Association football defenders
Club Nacional footballers
1930 FIFA World Cup players
1907 births
Year of death missing